Highway 15 in Jordan is also known as the Desert Highway runs in Jordan south to north.  It starts in Aqaba going north east towards Ma'an,  passing through the desert to the east of the major settlements in the southern region of  Jordan.  It then merges into the regional Highway 35 going to Amman. In Amman, it then follows the path of a newly constructed bypass highway to Zarqa.

See also
Highway 65 (Jordan)

External links
 
 Google maps itinerary of the highway

Roads in Jordan